Louder & Clearer is the second album by band Stanley Super 800. It was nominated for the Choice Music Prize for Irish Album of the Year 2007.

Track listing
"Introducing"
"Gatecrashing"
"Moonlight"
"Stars Come Out"
"Dark Angel"
"Voices In The Music"
"Hello"
"33 Seconds"
"Only You"
"Colour Test"
"Love x 3"
"A23"
"South Wind"

References

2007 albums
Stanley Super 800 albums